Tanvir Mokammel (born 8 March 1955) is a Bangladeshi filmmaker and writer. He is the recipient of Ekushey Padak in 2017. He won Bangladesh National Film Awards total ten times for the films Nodir Naam Modhumoti (1995), Chitra Nodir Pare (1999) and Lalsalu (2001). He is the current director of Bangladesh Film Institute in Dhaka.

Early life and education
Tanvir Mokammel grew up in Khulna. His father worked as a magistrate in Narail and his mother was a teacher in a local college. He completed his master's in English literature at the University of Dhaka.

Career
Since he was a university student, Mokammel worked as a left-wing journalist for landless peasants in rural areas. As a filmmaker he has made six full-length features and fifteen documentaries and short films, some of which have received national and international awards.

His feature films are "Nodir Naam Modhumoti" (The River Named Modhumati), "Chitra Nodir Pare" (Quiet Flows the River Chitra), "Lalsalu" (A Tree Without Roots), "Lalon" , "Rabeya" (The Sister), and "Jibondhuli" (The Drummer). Tanvir Mokammel's prominent documentaries are "The Garment Girls of Bangladesh", "The Unknown Bard", "Teardrops of Karnaphuli", "Riders to the Sunderbans", "A Tale of the Jamuna River", "The Promised Land", "Tajuddin Ahmad :An Unsung Hero", "The Japanese Wife", "Swapnabhumi" and mega-documentary "1971". His movies "Nadir Naam Modhumati" (The River Named Modhumati) and "Chitra Nodir Pare" (Quiet Flows the River Chitra) ranked second and third respectively in the list of 10 best Bangladeshi films, in the audience and critics' polls conducted by the British Film Institute.

Mokammel has written poems, short stories, and newspaper articles on cinema and cultural issues. Tanvir Mokammel's important books are "A Brief History of World Cinema", "The Art of Cinema", "Charlie Chaplin: Conquests by a Tramp", "Syed Waliullah, Sisyphus and Quest of Tradition in Novel" (a work of literary criticism), "Grundtvig and Folk Education" (a book on alternative educational ideas), and a translation of Maxim Gorky's play "The Lower Depths".

Mokammel established a film institute called Bangladesh Film Centre.

Filmography
{| class="wikitable sortable"
|-
! style="width:5%"  |Year
! style="width:17%" |Title
! style="width:17%" |English Title
! style="width:12%" |Contribution
! class="unsortable"|Notes
|-
| 1984
| Hooliya 
| Wanted
| Script/Direction
| An experimental short feature film based on a political poem by poet Nirmalendu Goon
|-
| 1991
| Smriti Ekattor
| Remembrance of ’71
| Script/Direction
| A documentary on the massacre on Bengalis in 1971.
|-
| 1993
| Ekti Golir Atyakahini 
| Tale of a Lane
| Script/Direction
| A documentary on the life and the present condition of the Hindu conch shell makers of old Dhaka
|-
| rowspan="3"| 1996
| Nodir Naam Modhumoti 
| The River Named Modhumati
| Script/Direction
| A feature film on the backdrop of the Bangladesh liberation war in 1971. 
Received three national awards for best story, best dialogue and best song. Shown in the Tri Continental Film Festival, Nantes, France.
|-
| Achin Pakhi 
| The  Unknown  Bird
| Script/Direction
| A documentary film on the Bauls.
|-
| Swapnar School
| A School for Swapna
| Script/Direction
| A documentary on the alternative schools for the poor adults
|-
| rowspan="2"| 1999
| Chitra Nodir Pare  
| Quiet Flows The River Chitra
| Script/Direction
| Won - National Film Awards in 7 category including Best Film.
|-
| Images And Impressions 
| Images And Impressions||Script/Direction
| A documentary on the ideals of the Folk High Schools in Denmark.
|-
| 2001 
| Lalsalu
| A Tree Without Roots
| Script/Direction
| Won - National Film Award in 7 category including Best Film.
|-
| 2002
| Oie Jamuna 
| A Tale of the Jamuna River||Script/Direction
|  
|-
| 2004
| Lalon 
| Lalon
| Script/Direction
| A Feature film on Lalon Shah. Won - National Film Award for Best Art Direction
|-
| rowspan="2"| 2005
|  Karnaphulir Kanna 
| Teardrops Of Karnaphuli
| Script/Direction
| A documentary on the plight of the Chakma, Marma, Tripura, Mrung and other indigenous people of the Chittagong Hill Tracts. The documentary was banned by the government of Bangladesh.
|-
| Bonojatri 
| Riders To The Sunderbans||Script/Direction
| A documentary film on the Sunderbans
|-
| rowspan="3"| 2007
|  Bostrobalikara
| Garment Girls of Bangladesh
| Script/Direction
| Won- Best documentary film of the year by Bangladesh Federation of Film Societies.
|-
| Nissonga Sarathi
| Tajuddin Ahmad: An Unsung Hero 
| Script/Direction
| A documentary about Tajuddin Ahmad, the first premier of Bangladesh.
|-
| Swapnabhumi 
| The Promised Land
| Script/Direction
| Won - Second Best Documentary Film by Film South Asia Film Festival, 2009, Nepal.
|-
| 2008
| Rabeya
| The Sister
| Script/Direction
| A deconstruction of Sophocles's play “Antigone” on the backdrop of the Bangladesh liberation war of 1971.
|-
| 2011
| 1971
| 1971
| Script/Direction
| A mega-documentary on the liberation war of Bangladesh. 
|-
| 2012
| Japani Bodhu
| The Japanese Wife
| Script/Direction
| A documentary on Hariprobha Takeda, the first Bengali woman who wrote a travelogue on Japan and used to read Bengali news from Tokyo Radio for Subash Bose's Azad Hind Fauz.|-
| 2014
| Jibondhuli  
| The Drummer||Script/Direction
| A feature film on the liberation war of Bangladesh in 1971.
|-
| 2017
| Seemantorekha  
| The Borderline||Script/Direction
| A documentary film on the Partition of Bengal in 1947.
|-
|2020
|Rupsha Nodir Banke|Quite flows the river Rupsha||Script/Direction
|A biographical film on the life of a leftist
|}

Awards and honors 
Mokammel received Ekushey Padak, the second highest civilian award in 2017 for notable contribution in Bengali film.

PublicationsChalachitra Nondontottwo o Barojon Director (Film Aesthetics and Twelve Directors); 1985, Sahitya Prakashoni, Chalachitra (Film); 1987, Bangla AcademyMarxbad O Sahitya (Marxism and Literature)Syed Waliullah, Sisyphus and Quest for Tradition in Novel; 1988, Muktodhara.Nitchutalar Manush, translation of Maxim Gorky's play The Lower Depths; 1997, Bishwo Shahitto Kendro,  .Charlie Chaplin: Triumph of the Tramp (Bhabaghurer Digbijoy), in Bengali, on the life and craft of Charlie Chaplin as an actor and film-maker, Sahitya Prakasoni, 1996.Grundtvig and Gonoshikhsa, a book on the theories of alternative education for the downtrodden and disadvantaged people of the rural areas, 1997.Art of Cinema (Cinemar Shilparup)'', in Bengali, a collection of essays on different aspects of the aesthetics of cinema, 1998, Agamee Prakashani

References

External links
 

1955 births
Living people
People from Khulna
University of Dhaka alumni
Bangladeshi male writers
Bangladeshi film directors
Best Director National Film Award (Bangladesh) winners
Recipients of the Ekushey Padak in arts
Best Dialogue National Film Award (Bangladesh) winners
Best Story National Film Award (Bangladesh) winners